Usta wallengrenii is a species of moth in the family Saturniidae. It is found in Ethiopia, Kenya, Namibia and South Africa.

References

Moths described in 1859
wallengrenii
Moths of Africa